Bridging the Gap may refer to:

Bridging the Gap (Black Eyed Peas album), 2000
Bridging the Gap (Charlie Wilson album), 2000
Bridging the Gap (Roger Troutman album), 1991
"Bridging the Gap" (song), by Nas, 2004

See also
 Bridging a Gap, a 1972 album by Mark Murphy